Robert Clark (6 February 1903 – 1970) was an English footballer who played as a forward for Newcastle United, Liverpool and Nottingham Forest in the Football League.

Clark played for Newcastle United before he signed for Liverpool, where he played 77 matches and scored 16 goals in five seasons. He only made two appearances that season, but he made 32 the following season, scoring nine goals. He only featured five more times during the next two seasons, and he moved to Nottingham Forest on 3 July 1931. He made five league appearances for Forest and scored two goals. In 1932, Clark joined North Shields.

References

1903 births
1970 deaths
association football forwards
English Football League players
English footballers
Liverpool F.C. players
Newcastle United F.C. players
North Shields F.C. players
Nottingham Forest F.C. players
People from Newburn
Footballers from Tyne and Wear
Prudhoe Castle F.C. players